Alexandre Koberidze (born October 19, 1984) is a Georgian filmmaker and screenwriter. His credits include the films Let the Summer Never Come Again (2017) and What Do We See When We Look at the Sky? (2021).

Career
He directed several short films before his first feature, Let the Summer Never Come Again (2017), a docufiction which won the Grand Prix and Prix Premier prizes at the Marseille Festival of Documentary Film and the German Film Critics Association Prize.

His second feature, What Do We See When We Look at the Sky?, won the FIPRESCI Prize at the Berlin International Film Festival.

Personal life and education
Born in Tbilisi, Georgia, he studied film and television there from 2001 to 2005. He then moved to Berlin in 2009 where he studied film directing at Deutsche Film- und Fernsehakademie Berlin.

Filmography

As director, writer, and editor

As actor

References

External links

Film directors from Georgia (country)
1984 births
Living people